Football Club Chernihiv is a Ukrainian football club based in Chernihiv that currently plays in the Ukrainian First League.

Crest and colours
The crest of the club was created in early 2003 and it was changed in 2017. The colours of the club are yellow and black.

Players

Current squad
As of 9 March 2023

Out on loan

Other players under contract

Personnel
As of 28 August 2022

Honours
Chernihiv Oblast Football Championship
   Winners (1): 2019
   Runners-up (2): 2011, 2014

Chernihiv Oblast Football Cup
  Winners (1): 2012
  Runners-up (1) 2016

Kit suppliers and shirt sponsors

Notable players

  Anatoliy Tymofeyev
  Teymuraz Mchedlishvili
  Ruslan Dedukh
  Maksym Chaus
  Oleksandr Konopko
  Dmytro Myronenko
  Yaroslav Serdyuk

Records and statistics

Most capped players

Top scorers

Managers and presidents

Presidents

Managers

League and cup history

{|class="wikitable"
|-bgcolor="#efefef"
! Season
! Div.
! Pos.
! Pl.
! W
! D
! L
! GS
! GA
! P
!Domestic Cup
!colspan=2|Other
!Notes
|-bgcolor=SteelBlue
|align=center rowspan=3|2013
|align=center|4th "2"
|align=center bgcolor=silver|2
|align=center|10
|align=center|5
|align=center|3
|align=center|2
|align=center|9
|align=center|5
|align=center|18
|align=center rowspan=3|
|align=center rowspan=3|
|align=center rowspan=3|
|align=center|First stage
|-bgcolor=SteelBlue
|align=center rowspan=2|4th "A"
|align=center rowspan=2|4
|align=center rowspan=2|3
|align=center rowspan=2|1
|align=center rowspan=2|0
|align=center rowspan=2|2
|align=center rowspan=2|2
|align=center rowspan=2|4
|align=center rowspan=2|3
|align=center|Finals
|-bgcolor=SteelBlue
|align=center bgcolor=pink|Withdrew
|-
|align=center colspan=14|regional competitions (Chernihiv Oblast)
|-bgcolor=SteelBlue
|align=center|2017–18
|align=center|4th "2"
|align=center|7
|align=center|14
|align=center|2
|align=center|3
|align=center|9
|align=center|10
|align=center|26
|align=center|9
|align=center|
|align=center|
|align=center|
|align=center bgcolor=pink|Withdrew
|-
|align=center|2018–19
|align=center colspan=9|regional competitions (Chernihiv Oblast)
|align=center|
|align=center|UAC
|align=center| finals
|align=center|
|-bgcolor=SteelBlue
|align=center|2019–20
|align=center|4th "2"
|align=center|5
|align=center|22
|align=center|9
|align=center|7
|align=center|6
|align=center|30
|align=center|23
|align=center|34
|align=center|
|align=center|
|align=center|
|align=center bgcolor=lightgreen|Admitted to SL
|-bgcolor=PowderBlue
|align=center|2020–21
|align=center|3rd "A"
|align=center|10
|align=center|24	
|align=center|5	 	
|align=center|6
|align=center|13
|align=center|19
|align=center|33
|align=center|21
|align=center| finals
|align=center|
|align=center|
|align=center|
|-bgcolor=PowderBlue
|align=center|2021–22
|align=center|3rd "A"
|align=center|10
|align=center|18
|align=center|5	 	
|align=center|5
|align=center|8
|align=center|17
|align=center|24
|align=center|20
|align=center| finals
|align=center|
|align=center|
|align=center bgcolor=lightgreen|Admitted to FL
|-bgcolor=LightCyan
|align=center|2022–23
|align=center|2nd "B"
|align=center|
|align=center|
|align=center|
|align=center|
|align=center|
|align=center|
|align=center|
|align=center|
|align=center|
|align=center|
|align=center|
|align=center|
|}

See also
 List of sport teams in Chernihiv
 FC Desna Chernihiv
 FC Desna-2 Chernihiv
 FC Desna-3 Chernihiv
 SDYuShOR Desna
 Yunist Chernihiv
 Yunist ShVSM
 Lehenda Chernihiv

References

External links
 Official website
 Profile at Official Site PFL

Media 
Telegram
Facebook
Youtube
Instagram

 
2003 establishments in Ukraine
Association football clubs established in 2003
Football clubs in Chernihiv Oblast
Football clubs in Chernihiv
Ukrainian First League clubs